Tellement proches is a 2009 French film directed by Olivier Nakache & Éric Toledano, starring Vincent Elbaz, Isabelle Carré, François-Xavier Demaison, Audrey Dana, Omar Sy, and Joséphine de Meaux.

Synopsis
Tellement proches is the story of Alain, who marries Nathalie and is forced to wrestle with the reality of his new in-law family, with all their combined eccentricities.

Cast and characters

 Vincent Elbaz as Alain
 Isabelle Carré as Nathalie
 François-Xavier Demaison as Jean-Pierre
 Audrey Dana as Catherine
 Omar Sy as Bruno
 Joséphine de Meaux as Roxane
 Jean Benguigui as Prosper
 Catherine Hosmalin as Nicole
 Lionel Abelanski as Charly
 Lizzie Brocheré as Clara
 Valérie Karsenti as Chantal
 Max Clavelly as Lucien
 Matthieu Boujenah as Old Lucien
 Ary Abittan as Moshé Benhamou
 Talina Boyaci as Gaëlle
 Arsène Mosca as Patrice
 Laurence Février as Colette
 Jean-Pierre Clami as Étienne
 Laurentine Milebo as Fatou
 Renée Le Calm as Geneviève Grimperai
 Alain Guillo as Jérôme Lefèvre
 Éric Naggar as Monsieur Kadoche
 Wahid Bouzidi as Redo
 Soufiane Guerrab as Francky
 François Toumarkine as Langueteau
 Guy Faucher as Roger
 Raphaël Toledano as Maurice
 Jade Samba-Seale as Juliette
 Karunakaran Nair as Farath
 Elmo Desmond Wjesundera as Elmo
 Lannick Gautry as Judo's teacher
 Charlie Dupont as Pottery's teacher
 Géraldine Nakache as The religious
 Lise Lamétrie as Director of the nursery

References

External links
 

2009 comedy films
2009 films
French comedy films
Films directed by Olivier Nakache and Éric Toledano
2000s French films
2000s French-language films